Björn Brunnemann (born 6 August 1980) is a German former professional footballer who played as a midfielder.

Career 
Brunnemann was born in Kyritz, East Germany. He made his debut on the professional league level in the 2. Bundesliga for FC Energie Cottbus on 10 August 2003 when he came on as a substitute in the 69th minute in a game against 1. FC Union Berlin.

Following seasons with teams including FC St. Pauli he signed with BFC Dynamo in 2012. In his first season with the wine-reds he won the Berlin Cup trophy, thus qualifying for the DFB-Pokal. In his second season with BFC Dynamo he led the team to 19 victories in its initial 20 championship games, thus helping the side to secure promotion to Regionalliga. In March 2014, he extended his contract with BFC throughout the 2014–15 season.

References

External links
 
 

1980 births
Living people
German footballers
Association football midfielders
FC Hansa Rostock players
FC Energie Cottbus players
FC Rot-Weiß Erfurt players
FC St. Pauli players
1. FC Union Berlin players
Berliner AK 07 players
Berliner FC Dynamo players
VSG Altglienicke players
2. Bundesliga players
Regionalliga players
People from Kyritz
Footballers from Brandenburg